Salamon Berger Ouz (25 February 1858 – 11 January 1934) was a Croatian Jewish industrialist, textile trader, and founder and first director of the Ethnographic Museum in Zagreb.

Berger Ouz was born on 25 February 1858 in Mnešice, Nové Mesto nad Váhom, in present-day Slovakia. When he lost his parents at 16 years of age, Berger moved to Zagreb. As a textile merchant and manufacturer, Berger presented the products of Croatian industry on 96 exhibitions across the Europe, United States and Australia. Over the course of his business travels around Croatia and Kingdom of Yugoslavia, he amassed a collection of ethnographic artefacts. The biggest portion of textile artefacts in his collection - such as weavings and lace items - Berger had collected in the Posavina region. In 1919, Berger founded the Ethnographic Museum in Zagreb, featuring over 8,000 textile items from his collections, titled "The Land Collection of Salamon Berger". He also served as museum's first director until 1925, when he retired and was named honorary director. Berger died in Zagreb in 1934 and was buried at Mirogoj Cemetery.

References

Bibliography

 

1858 births
1934 deaths
People from Nové Mesto nad Váhom
Croatian Jews
Croatian people of Slovak-Jewish descent
Croatian philanthropists
Jewish philanthropists
Burials at Mirogoj Cemetery
Croatian ethnographers
Businesspeople from Zagreb